Neil Mortensen  is a professor of colorectal surgery at the University of Oxford Medical School. In 2020, he was appointed president of the Royal College of Surgeons of England.

References

External links

Colorectal surgeons
Living people
Year of birth missing (living people)